"Cleva" is a song recorded by American singer Erykah Badu for her second studio album Mama's Gun (2000). It was written and produced by Badu, J Dilla, and James Poyser, a member of the Soulquarians and Badu's own production team Frequency. The song features Roy Ayers on vibraphone. It was released as the third and final single from Mama's Gun on April 17, 2001, by Motown Records.

Due to its limited, airplay-only release, "Cleva" failed to chart on the US Billboard Hot 100, but peaked at number 77 on the Hot R&B/Hip-Hop Songs.

Track listing
US promotional 12-inch vinyl
"Cleva" (radio edit) – 3:55
"Cleva" (album version) – 4:33
"Cleva" (instrumental) – 4:32
"Cleva" (acappella) – 3:41

Charts

Release history

References

2001 singles
Erykah Badu songs
Songs written by James Poyser
Songs written by Erykah Badu
2000 songs
Motown singles
Songs written by J Dilla
Soul jazz songs